Chiara D'Anna is an Italian actress, director, writer and academic notable for working with the writer and director Peter Strickland in Berberian Sound Studio and The Duke of Burgundy. While studying Geology at the University of Turin she joined drama school. Her directorial debut was an adaptation of Bulghakov's The Master and Margarita. The following year her adaptation of Oscar Wilde's Salome was awarded the Aquilegia Blu National Prize. After obtaining her MSc she left Italy to pursue her acting career in London.

Life and work
D'Anna was born near Turin, Italy. She studied Geology and spent most of early twenties between the Alps and the Himalayas. She trained in Italy, Poland and the UK and holds a BSc and MSc in Geology from the University of Turin, an MA in Physical Theatre from Royal Holloway University and a PhD in Performing Arts from the School of Art, Architecture and Design at London Metropolitan University.  At completion of her MA in Physical Theatre at Royal Holloway University she started lecturing at Rose Bruford College and working as a freelance Movement and Acting Coach.

In 2010 she founded Panta Rei Theatre. The company's vision is to 'inspire open mindedness and compassion by engaging the audience on a physical, emotional, intellectual and spiritual level.' Her productions have been praised for their originality, creativity and outstanding visual power. Her wide-ranging body of work includes text-based theatre, multimedia performances, site-specific immersive work, happenings, dance theatre, street theatre, performance-installations, combined arts events and Commedia dell'Arte shows.

Her film career began in 2011 with her debut in Peter Strickland award-winning Berberian Sound Studio. A couple of year later Strickland cast her as co-lead opposite Sidse Babett Knudsen in The Duke of Burgundy. This performance brought D'Anna to the attention of many critics worldwide. At the Toronto International Film Festival D'Anna was nominated as one of the 13 Actors to Watch Out For. Since then she has appeared in several features and short films including Native, The Rook and Stars and Bones for which she was awarded the "Inspiring Woman in A Film" at the Los Angeles Film Awards, April 2017.

Between 2014 and 2018 she led a practice-led research project on the legacy of Commedia dell'Arte in Postdramatic theatre at the School of Art, Architecture and Design. D'Anna still maintains strong links with academia and education. She teaches Movement on the MA Theatre Lab at RADA and works as an Associate Lecturer at Rose Bruford College, East15 Acting School, Goldsmiths University in the UK and the Accademia dell’Arte in Arezzo, Italy .

D'Anna lives in North London with her partner therapist, education consultant and author Michael Warwick with whom she founded Natural You , "an holistic and transformative practice exploring the connection between Body, Mind and Spirit. It draws on Yoga, Dance, Physical Theatre and self-development work".

Filmography 
 Actress
 2012 : Berberian Sound Studio
 2014 : The Duke of Burgundy
 2015 : The Rook (short film) 
 2016 : Native 
 2016 : Circe and the Boy  (short film)
 2017 : Stars and Bones (short film)

References

External links
 
Chiara D'Anna on Spotlight
Chiara D'Anna website
Panta Rei Theatre company website
Exclusive Interview: Chiara D'Anna talks The Duke of Burgundy
S&M Saves: Inside the Kinkiest Arthouse Film of the Year. Rolling Stones Magazine
Rencontre avec Chiara D'Anna, Les Arcs Film Festival. Interview. 
TIFF 2014 The Duke of Burgundy Intro 
BFI LFF Interviews
BFI LFF Q&A The Duke of Burgundy
Q&A with Peter Srickland & Chiara D'Anna TFF32 
The Duke of Burgundy Review. Empire Magazine*****
The Duke of Burgundy: Sexy and Strange. The Telegraph*****
An arthouse Fifty Shades? Peter Strickland's erotic The Duke of Burgundy will get you hot under the collar...The Independent****
'The Duke of Burgundy' a mesmerizing sexual thriller. LA Times***** 
BBC Radio 4 Front Row Review of The Duke of Burgundy*****
Director Peter Strickland’s sumptuous, all-female S&M fable is his greatest film to date. The Little White Lies***** 
Chiara, ritorno a Torino "Io, come la Hepburn nel mélo sadomaso" La Repubblica
50 Shades of Burgundy: a lesbian S&M film to rival the grey?
Chiara D'Anna On ... Bringing Don Quixote to Peckham

Italian actresses
Living people
Year of birth missing (living people)
Place of birth missing (living people)